The 2021 season is the 71st season of competitive association football in China.

National teams

China national football team

Results and fixtures

2022 FIFA World Cup qualification

Second round

Third round

Friendlies

China women's national football team

Results and fixtures

Olympic Qualifying Tournament

|}

Summer Olympics

AFC competitions

AFC Champions League

AFC Champions League qualifying play-offs round

Play-off round

|}

Group stage

Group I

Group J

Men's football

Super League

Regular season

Group A

Group B

Championship stage

Relegation stage

League One

League Two

First stage

Group A

Group B

Group C

Ranking of third-placed teams

Second stage

Group D

Group E

Group F

Women's football

Super League

Regular season

Championship stage

Relegation stage

Football League

League Two

Managerial changes
This is a list of changes of managers within Chinese professional league football:

Chinese Super League

China League One

Notes

References

 
2021 sport-related lists
China